Daniela Brendel (born 29 September 1973) is a German former swimmer, born in Berlin, who competed in the 1992 Summer Olympics.

References

1973 births
Living people
Swimmers from Berlin
German female swimmers
German female breaststroke swimmers
Olympic swimmers of Germany
Swimmers at the 1992 Summer Olympics
Olympic silver medalists for Germany
Medalists at the 1992 Summer Olympics
Olympic silver medalists in swimming